Tegher is a village in the Ashtarak Municipality of the Aragatsotn Province of Armenia on the southern slope of Mount Aragats.

The town contains the Monastery of Tegher built in 1213.  The ruins of the 9th century village of Tegher (Old Tegher) sit a short distance walk from the monastery.  Numerous foundations may be seen, along with the remains of a Tukh Manuk funerary chapel of the 5th century.  Nearby is also a medieval to 19th century cemetery with some mausoleums and khachkars.

Nearby is also a large radio telescope as well as an unfinished solar power plant, both from the Soviet era.

Gallery

Demographics

References 

Report of the results of the 2001 Armenian Census

External links 
 Visit Tegher village

Populated places in Aragatsotn Province